Victoria Hanley is an American young adult fantasy novelist. Her first three books, The Seer And The Sword, The Healer's Keep and The Light Of The Oracle are companion books to one another. Her newest book (released March 2012) is the sequel of a series, called Indigo Magic, published by Egmont USA.  She's also published two non-fiction books through Cotton Wood Press; called Seize the Story: A Handbook For Teens Who Like To Write, and 'Wild Ink: A Grownups Guide To Writing Fiction For Teens'.

Works

Novels

Healer and Seer series
 The Seer and the Sword (2000)
 The Healer's Keep (2002)
The Light of the Oracle (2004)
 Tirfeyne series
 Violet Wings (2009)
 Indigo Magic (2012 Book) (2012)

External links
Official Site
FantasticFiction page

References

Year of birth missing (living people)
Living people
20th-century American novelists
21st-century American novelists
American fantasy writers
American women novelists
Women science fiction and fantasy writers
20th-century American women writers
21st-century American women writers
American women non-fiction writers
20th-century American non-fiction writers
21st-century American non-fiction writers